The Wild West Show is a lost 1928 American silent Western film directed by Del Andrews and starring Hoot Gibson. It was produced and distributed through Universal Pictures.

Cast
 Hoot Gibson - Rodeo Bill
 Dorothy Gulliver - Ruth Henson
 Allan Forrest - Alexander
 Gale Henry - Zella
 Monte Montague - Bill's Sidekick
 Roy Laidlaw - Joe Henson
 John Hall - Sheriff

References

External links
 
 

1928 films
Lost American films
1928 Western (genre) films
Lost Western (genre) films
American black-and-white films
1928 lost films
Silent American Western (genre) films
Films directed by Del Andrews
1920s American films
1920s English-language films